Code Name: Eternity is a Canadian science fiction series that ran for 26 episodes starting in 1999. It was later shown on the Sci Fi Channel in the United States.

The plot involves an alien scientist, David Banning, who comes to Earth and assumes human form in order to perfect technology which will radically change Earth's environment to be suitable for habitation by his own species, i.e. planetary engineering. Having discovered the true nature of Banning's plans, a team of assassins is sent to take him down. Banning's forces kill most of them, but the most dangerous one, Ethaniel, escapes and teams up with a human scientist, Dr. Laura Keating, in an attempt to prevent the destruction of Earth and humanity.

The series was filmed in Toronto, Ontario, Canada. It was cancelled after one season and ended on a cliffhanger.

Echo Bridge Home Entertainment announced Code Name: Eternity: The Complete Series on DVD.

Cast 
 Cameron Bancroft as Ethaniel
 Ingrid Kavelaars as Dr. Laura Keating
 Andrew Gillies as David Banning
 Joseph Baldwin as Byder
 Gordon Currie as Dent
 Olivier Gruner as Tawrens
 Jeff Wincott as Breed

Episodes 
 "Ethaniel's Story"
 "The Mission"
 "The Hunter"
 "The Long Drop"
 "The Watery Grave"
 "Never Go Home"
 "Tawrens"
 "Making Love"
 "Death Trap"
 "The Bounty Hunter"
 "Thief"
 "Lose Your Dreams"
 "24 Hours"
 "Deep Down"
 "Fatal Error"
 "Sold Out For a Song"
 "All the News"
 "Laura's Story"
 "Project Midas"
 "Dark of Night"
 "Not a Bite to Eat"
 "The Box"
 "Underground"
 "Chameleon"
 "All Fall Down"
 "The Shift"

External links 
 Code Name: Eternity official site (Syfy). Archived from the original on March 7, 2005. Includes episode synopses, character profiles, bios.
 

2000 Canadian television series debuts
2000 Canadian television series endings
2000s Canadian science fiction television series
First-run syndicated television shows in Canada
Television shows filmed in Toronto
Television series by Warner Bros. Television Studios